Martín Horacio Rivero (born November 13, 1989 in Roldán) is an Argentine footballer who currently plays for San Martín SJ.

Career
Rivero began his career in the youth ranks of Rosario Central and made his first team debut as a teenager during the 2008 season. He made his debut on June 20, 2008 in a 2-1 defeat to Argentinos Juniors in the 2007–08 Argentine Primera División season. Playing primarily as an attacking midfielder Rivero scored five goals over 53 games for Rosario Central.

On February 16, 2012, Rivero signed a loan deal with Major League Soccer side Colorado Rapids from Rosario Central.

On January 14, 2014 it was announced by the Rapids that Rivero would not be returning for the 2014 season.

He was traded by Colorado to Chivas USA on April 10, 2014 in exchange for a fourth-round 2015 MLS SuperDraft pick.

References

External links
 
 

1989 births
Living people
Argentine footballers
Rosario Central footballers
Colorado Rapids players
Chivas USA players
Aldosivi footballers
Unión de Santa Fe footballers
Club Atlético Belgrano footballers
Club Atlético Patronato footballers
San Martín de San Juan footballers
Argentine expatriate footballers
Expatriate soccer players in the United States
Major League Soccer players
Association football midfielders